Loose Balls: The Short Wild Life of the American Basketball Association is a sports book originally published in 1990 by Simon & Schuster. The book, a history of the original American Basketball Association, was written by sportswriter Terry Pluto, although much of his writing is limited to introductions and summaries of each season. Most of the dialogue is from former players, league executives, and journalists, among others.

The Cast
Almost the entire book is told by former players, executives, and journalists, all of whom are listed at the beginning as the "Cast of Characters." Some of those interviewed include:
 Rick Barry
 Pat Boone
 Hubie Brown
 Larry Brown
 Mack Calvin
 Bob Costas
 Mel Daniels
 Julius Erving
 Cotton Fitzsimmons
 Dan Issel
 Slick Leonard
 Rudy Martzke
 George Mikan
 Doug Moe
 Bob Ryan
 Joe Tait
 Lenny Wilkens
 James "Fly" Williams

In the book, the writing is set so that a topic is introduced by Pluto, and then one of the "cast members'" names is highlighted, followed by their memories on the subject.  The book covers the entire history of the ABA, from the league's founding in 1967 through the ABA–NBA merger in 1976.

External links
 Loose Balls at amazon.com
 "Long Shots" at amazon.com

1990 non-fiction books
American Basketball Association
Basketball books